Trey Told 'Em is a collaborative project between Gregg Gillis of Girl Talk and Frank Musarra of Hearts of Darknesses focused on "remix and production work."

Remixes
 Tokyo Police Club - "Cheer It On" (2007) (samples Carl Carlton's "She's a Bad Mama Jama (She's Built, She's Stacked)", UGK's "Hit the Block" and Kool & the Gang's "Celebration")
 Simian Mobile Disco - "I Believe" (2007) (samples Rihanna's "Umbrella" and Rob Thomas's "Lonely No More")

 Professor Murder - "Dutch Hex" (2007) (samples Beyoncé's "Get Me Bodied" and Michael Jackson's "Stranger in Moscow")
 Of Montreal - "Gronlandic Edit" (2007) (unreleased, but featured on a mix on XM Radio) (samples Dr. Hook's "Sexy Eyes")
 Cardboard Records (Love and Circuits compilation) - "All Of The Other Songs Remixed" (2007)
 Thrill Jockey Records - "Super Epic Thrill Jockey Mega Massive Anniversary Mix" (2007)
 Kings of Leon - (2009) (unreleased) 
 Kesha - "Tik Tok" (2010) 
 Isabella Clarke - "Speak Up" (2017)

References

External links
 Artist Page at Thrill Jockey Records
 Trey Told 'Em Myspace

American record producers
Record production teams